Alfred Beard Kittredge (March 28, 1861May 4, 1911) was a United States senator from South Dakota.

Early life and education
Kittredge was born in Nelson, New Hampshire, the son of Russell H. Kittredge, a physician, and Laura Frances (Holmes) Kittredge.  He was raised and educated in Jaffrey, New Hampshire.  Kittredge graduated from Yale College in 1882 and studied law with Wheelock G. Veazey of Rutland, Vermont and at the firm of Bachelder and Faulkner in Keene, New Hampshire.  He then attended Yale Law School, from which he graduated in 1885.  He was admitted to the bar in 1885 and commenced practice in Sioux Falls, South Dakota.  While establishing himself as an attorney, Kittredge became the Sioux Falls correspondent for the St. Paul Pioneer Press, a leading Republican newspaper, which enabled him to develop personal and professional contacts that proved useful during his political career.

Political career
A Republican, Kittredge served as chairman of the party in Minnehaha County.  He was twice elected to the South Dakota Senate, and served from 1889 to 1893.  He was a member of the Republican National Committee from 1892 to 1899.

In 1901, Kittredge was appointed to the U.S. Senate to fill the vacancy caused by the death of James H. Kyle.  He was elected to a full term in 1903, and served from July 11, 1901 to March 3, 1909.  While in the Senate, he was chairman of the Select Committee on Standards, Weights and Measures (57th Congress), the Committee on Patents (58th and 59th Congresses), and the Committee on Interoceanic Canals (60th Congress).  His committee on canals was in part responsible for the selection of Panama over Nicaragua as the location for construction of a canal between the Atlantic and Pacific Oceans.

Kittredge was an unsuccessful candidate for renomination in 1908.  After leaving the Senate, he resumed the practice of law in Sioux Falls.

Later life
In his later years, Kittredge's weight exceeded 300 pounds, and he began to experience health problems.  In October 1910, he became chronically ill after overexerting himself while walking from the courthouse to his offices in cold weather.  His doctors recommended that he end his law practice and business affairs, and Kittredge returned to Jaffrey to live in retirement.

Death and burial
In February 1911, Kittredge traveled to Hot Springs, Arkansas in hopes of recovering his health.  He continued to decline, and became comatose in late April.  He died in Hot Springs on May 4, 1911.  He was buried at Conant Cemetery in Jaffrey, New Hampshire.  Kittredge never married, and had no children.

References

Sources

Internet

Newspapers

Books

External links

 

1861 births
1911 deaths
People from Nelson, New Hampshire
Republican Party United States senators from South Dakota
Republican Party South Dakota state senators
Politicians from Sioux Falls, South Dakota
19th-century American politicians
South Dakota lawyers
Yale College alumni
19th-century American lawyers